There are several derbies in the Allsvenskan and in the lower divisions of the Swedish football pyramid.

Background 

Most derbies in the league exist for geographical reasons, like most leagues in the world.

Like Spain's Superclasico and the Liverpool–Manchester rivalry, derbies also take place between clubs from two cities in different parts of the country, most of which involve one of the three big Stockholm based teams and either Malmö or Gothenburg.

City derbies

Stockholm

AIK vs Djurgården

AIK vs Djurgården is the most classic derby in Stockholm and is known as the fiercest derby in Sweden. The clubs are historically Stockholm's biggest and most successful clubs with AIK having won a total of 12 Swedish Championships and Djurgården also 12. The rivalry has existed since 1891, the year both clubs were founded in, separated by just three weeks. Thereby known as Tvillingderbyt (Derby of the twins), matches between the two clubs are sometimes listed in the European top ten of hottest derbies. Since 1891, 220 fixtures have been contested in all competitions with both clubs winning 80 games each. Historically AIK has been the most victorious between the two of all fixtures.

Djurgården consider the affluent Östermalm district, the eastern part of Stockholm City Centre, their traditional  heartland, while AIK has a strong concentration of fans in the northwest, roughly along the blue line of the Metro. 

AIK supporters are nicknamed "gnagare" (Swedish for rodents), while the Djurgården supporters are called "järnkaminer" (”The iron stoves"). Although Djurgården supporters also have a derogatory nickname, namely "apor" ("monkeys") used by their rivals due to their name "Djurgården" deriving from the island with the same name in Stockholm’s archipelago that inhabits the famous Skansen zoo-park. In 2019 the game played at Friends Arena had an attendance of 45 367.

This rivalry is also found in ice hockey which further aggravates tension between both sets of fans and shapes the rivalry as quite unique in Sweden. In general, the supporters of these two clubs consider the other team to be their biggest rival.

AIK vs Hammarby

AIK and Hammarby are arguably the two football clubs with the biggest support in Sweden. In 2015, two of the three games between these two teams had an attendance of 41 063 and 41 630 respectively. Hammarby consider Södermalm, the southern district of Stockholm City Centre where the club was founded, and the boroughs south of said district, their heartland. AIK have a strong concentration of fans in the north, west and centre of the city, roughly along the blue line of the Metro.

Djurgården vs Hammarby

This derby is considered less significant than the AIK-Djurgården rivalry but equally or possibly even more intense than the AIK-Hammarby rivalry. This fiercely contended football rivalry traces its origin back to the later half of the 1910s but did not reach relevance until the 1950s and '60s when Hammarby established themselves as a top-flight outfit. Hammarby consider Södermalm, the southern district of Stockholm City Centre where the club was founded, as well as the boroughs just south of said district, their heartland. Djurgården counts Östermalm, the district that forms the eastern part of the city centre, and where their former home ground Stadion is situated, as their stronghold. Djurgården's former home ground Stockholm Olympic Stadium was located adjacent to the Östermalm district, while Hammarby has since 1946 predominantly played in the Johanneshov district, just south of Södermalm. In 2013, both teams moved into the newly constructed Tele2 Arena located in Johanneshov, which has increased tensions significantly between Djurgården and Hammarby fans.

Gothenburg

IFK Göteborg vs Örgryte IS

Traditionally the main rivalry in Gothenburg, contested between the city's most successful sides. Before the foundation of IFK Göteborg, the dominant club in the Gothenburg area was Örgryte IS, then considered a middle class club and in later years an upper class club. IFK became popular amongst the working class, creating a fierce rivalry based upon both local pride and social class. In the early 20th century, supporters were supposed to act as gentlemen, applauding and supporting both their own team, and the opponents. However, this proved a hard task for supporters of the Gothenburg teams. Local patriotism and class differences sometimes resulted in fights and pitch invasions, making the Swedish press view IFK and Örgryte fans as the scum of Swedish football. The derbies between the two teams have attracted some of the highest attendance in Swedish football. The fixture attracted 52,194 spectators in 1959, an all time Allsvenskan record. The rivalry has decreased in recent years due to the decline of Örgryte IS.

IFK Göteborg vs GAIS

IFK Göteborg and GAIS are the two best supported clubs in the city with 50 percent and 12 percent of the city respectively supporting them. Both club's supporters are historically working-class. The biggest attendance in "Göteborgsklassikern" (Gothenburg Classic) is 50,690 at Nya Ullevi stadium.

GAIS vs Örgryte IS
Games between the second most popular (GAIS, supported by 12 percent of the city) and third most popular (Örgryte, supported by 11 percent) clubs of Gothenburg do not stir up the same kind of emotion as the other derbies in the city tend to do. Though there is some ill feeling between the clubs due to GAIS traditionally being seen as a working-class club and Örgryte IS being seen as an upper-class club.

BK Häcken
As the smallest club of the Gothenburg area, and based on the island Hisingen, the rivalry with the bigger clubs in Gothenburg is not especially strong but has increased due BK Häcken having established itself as a first-tier club. In the 2012 Allsvenskan they finished as runners up.

Malmö

IFK Malmö vs Malmö FF

A significant rivalry in the early 20th century, since the 1960s the clubs have played only one cup fixture.

Södertälje

Assyriska FF vs Syrianska FC
Based in the city of Södertälje, 35 kilometers southwest of Stockholm, both clubs share the 6,700 capacity Södertälje Fotbollsarena. The two sides are the most successful and popular "immigrant clubs" in Sweden and are mostly supported by Assyrians/Syriacs. Assyriska Föreningen were founded in 1971 and Syrianska in 1977 by Assyrian refugees.

Norrköping

IFK Norrköping vs IK Sleipner
Sleipner were in the early 20th century seen as the working-class club in Norrköping, and the sides battled in Allsvenskan up until the 1940s. After that Sleipner has fallen through the divisions however and the rivalry is all but forgotten today, except among older generations.

Halmstad
Halmstads BK vs IS Halmia
A derby played in the town of Halmstad, with both teams sharing the main local football stadium Örjans Vall. The majority of the matches have been played in the leagues just below Allsvenskan. Halmia being the dominant team until the 1930s when the teams became more evenly matched. The last competitive derby, to date, was played in 1979 as Halmia was relegated the same year and has fallen through to the fourth tier. The derbies that have been played since have mainly been friendly matches or in local youth competitions.

Regional rivalries

Scania County
Helsingborgs IF vs Malmö FF

Known as Skånederbyt. A significant rivalry between the two most successful sides from the southern part of the country and the county of Scania, Helsingborgs IF and Malmö FF.

Helsingborgs IF vs Landskrona BoIS
Known as Nordvästra Skånederbyt. A match between the two biggest clubs from the northwestern part of the county of Scania, Helsingborgs IF and Landskrona BoIS.

Malmö FF vs Trelleborgs FF
Known as Sydvästra Skånederbyt. A minor rivalry solely based on geography between two clubs from the southwestern part of Scania, Malmö FF and Trelleborgs FF.

IFK Malmö vs Torns IF vs Lunds BK
Known as Little Skånederbyt.
A minor rivalry between IFK Malmö and Torns IF and Lunds BK

Västra Götaland County
IF Elfsborg vs IFK Göteborg
The fixture between IF Elfsborg and IFK Göteborg is known as the Västderby (Western Derby) or as "El Västico".
Elfsborg is based in Borås, 65 kilometers east of Gothenburg.

Halland province
Halmstad BK vs Falkenbergs FF vs Varbergs BoIS
Derbies in Halland consist mainly of fixtures between the highest ranking teams Halmstads BK, Falkenbergs FF and Varbergs BoIS.

The biggest rivalry in the province is between Falkenbergs FF and Halmstads BK. These are the two clubs with the most supporters in the province and the games attract relatively big crowds. The fixture between the two coastal cities is sometimes jokingly referred to as "El Custico", a wordplay on kust (the Swedish word for "coast") and "clásico".

Games between Varbergs BoIS and Falkenbergs FF also attract relatively big crowds.

Halmstads BK vs. Varbergs BoIS is a minor rivalry, due to the fact that both Halmstad and Varberg consider Falkenberg their biggest rivals. Falkenberg is situated at a roughly equal distance between Halmstad and Varberg.

Historically the "Halmstad derby", between Halmstads BK and IS Halmia, was fierce but has little importance since Halmia play in the fourth tier.

Småland province
Kalmar FF vs Östers IF
The two most supported clubs in the historical province of Småland fight the Smålandsderbyt. Östers IF from Växjö have four titles in Allsvenskan and Kalmar FF have one title.

Jönköpings Södra IF vs Östers IF
Both clubs are situated in the same province of Småland and currently play in the Superettan (Second division) league. The ambition to create a rivalry comes mainly from Jönköpings Södra IF fans, this is only met with disappointment from Öster fans who cannot recognize them enough as a true rival, due to the Jönköping Södra team's lack of "real fans" and historical fixtures with Öster.

Norrland
GIF Sundsvall vs Östersunds FK
These two teams are the only two Norrland sides who have competed in the first tier in recent years, and are based in two neighboring "landskap" (historical provinces), Medelpad and Jämtland, whose inhabitants also have a rivalry outside sports. There is a 190 kilometer distance between the two cities who are roughly the same size.

GIF Sundsvall vs Umeå FC
The match between GIF Sundsvall and Umeå FC has been seen as the most prestigious derby in Norrland, the northern part of Sweden. Even though the distance between the cities is 264 km. Sundsvall also has a minor derby against Gefle IF in Norrland. Ice hockey is given more attention than football in Norrland, and its derbies are considered more prestigious.

Örebro Län
Örebro SK vs Degerfors IF
The derby between Örebro SK and Degerfors IF is known as a länsderby (county derby). Even though Degerfors historically belongs to Värmland province and Örebro SK to Närke province, the rivalry is relatively fierce.

Östergötland
IFK Norrköping vs Åtvidabergs FF
IFK Norrköping vs Åtvidabergs FF is known as "Östgötaderbyt". It is the fixture between the two most successful clubs in the historical province of Östergötland. The fixture also gains prestige from Åtvidaberg's proximity to Linköping, the largest city in the province, who itself has a rivalry with Norrköping, the second largest city in the province.

Sporting rivalries

IFK Göteborg vs Malmö FF

Played between the two most successful sides in Sweden. The rivalry was at its most significant in the 1980s when both clubs dominated Swedish football.

AIK vs IFK Göteborg

The biggest rivalry between a Stockholm-based club and a Gothenburg-based club. It can be said to be a footballing rivalry as well as inter-city based rivalry between the most successful teams from Stockholm and Gothenburg respectively. The nation's two largest cities share a big inter-city rivalry. Fixtures between different clubs from the two cities are seen as important, but this clash is the only one which can be seen as a full on rivalry.

Hammarby vs Malmö FF
Any Stockholm club are not seen well in Malmö. A higher Hammarby vs Malmö FF rivalry ignited in 2019 when Zlatan Ibrahimović bought shares in Hammarby. After this the statue of him in his home city Malmö was vandalised and he was accused of being a traitor.

See also
Denmark–Sweden football rivalry

References

Sources cited

External links 
 Sveriges Fotbollshistoriker och Statistiker - statistics site
 Allsvenskan.just.nu  - statistics site